Mark Guiliana (born September 2, 1980) is a Grammy-nominated American drummer, composer and leader of the band Beat Music. He has played with Avishai Cohen, Brad Mehldau, David Bowie, Meshell Ndegeocello, Gretchen Parlato, Jason Lindner, Lionel Loueke, Dhafer Youssef, Tigran Hamasyan, Matisyahu, St. Vincent, the European piano trio Phronesis and his own groups, Heernt and the Mark Giuliana Jazz Quartet.

Biography
Guiliana was born and raised in New Jersey, and attended William Paterson University, where he graduated in 2003 with a degree in Jazz Studies and Performance.

Mark Guiliana is a drummer, composer, educator, producer and founder of Beat Music Productions, through which he released My Life Starts Now and Beat Music: The Los Angeles Improvisations as a bandleader.

His conceptual approach to the instrument is also featured in Mehliana, the electric duo featuring Brad Mehldau on keyboards and synthesizers. The group's debut album, Taming the Dragon (Nonesuch), was released in early 2014.

Over the past decade, Guiliana's extensive touring has taken him across six continents with artists including Meshell Ndegeocello, Gretchen Parlato, Avishai Cohen, Matisyahu, Lionel Loueke, Now vs. Now, Dhafer Youssef, Beat Music and Heernt. He has also appeared on over 30 recordings to date, including Blackstar, David Bowie's final album.

Guiliana was described by The New York Times as “a drummer around whom a cult of admiration has formed,” while Time Out wrote, "What happens when you add hard bop drum masters Elvin Jones and Art Blakey to a 1980s Roland 808 drum machine, divide the result by J Dilla and then multiply to the power of Squarepusher? Answer: Mark Guiliana."

Awards and honors
2016: DownBeat magazine: “25 for the Future”

Discography

As leader/co-leader
 EP (2010) 
 Beat Music (2012) 
 A Form of Truth (2013)
 BEAT MUSIC The Los Angeles Improvisations (2014)
 My Life Starts Now (2014)
 Family First (2015)
 Jersey (2017)
 Beat Music! Beat Music! Beat Music! (2019)
 Music For Doing (2022)
 the sound of listening (2022)

As Heernt
 Locked in a Basement (Razdaz Recordz, 2006) recorded in 2005

With Brad Mehldau
 Mehliana: Taming the Dragon (Nonesuch, 2014)

As sideman
With David Bowie
 Nothing Has Changed, "Sue (Or in a Season of Crime)" (2014)
 Blackstar (2016)
 No Plan (EP) (2017)

With Matt Cameron
 Cavedweller (2017)

With Avishai Cohen
 Lyla (2003)
 At Home (Avishai Cohen album)|At Home (2004)
 Continuo (2006)
 As is...Live at the Blue Note (2007)
 Gently Disturbed (2008)
 Sha'ot Regishot (2008)

With Dave Douglas
High Risk (Greenleaf, 2015)
Dark Territory (Greenleaf, 2016)

With Aaron Dugan
 Theory of Everything (2010)

With Janek Gwizdala
 It Only Happens Once (2012)

With Dumpster Hunter
 Frustration in Time Travel (2013)

With Jason Lindner ("Now VS Now")
 Now VS Now (2009)
 Earth Analog (2013)

With Lionel Loueke
 Heritage (Lionel Loueke album)|Heritage (2012)

With Matisyahu
 Akeda (2014)

With Donny McCaslin
 Perpetual Motion (2011)
 Casting for Gravity (2012)
 Fast Future (2014)
 Beyond Now (2016)

With Brad Mehldau
 Finding Gabriel (Nonesuch, 2019)
 Jacob's Ladder (Nonesuch, 2020–2021)

With Chris Morrissey
 North Hero (2013)

With Gretchen Parlato
 Live in NYC (2013)

With Phronesis
 Alive (2010)

With Brad Shepik
 Across the Way (2011)
 Mob of Unruly Angels (2010)

With Young Astronauts Club
 Montréal (Mark Guiliana Mixes) (2015)

With Dhafer Youssef
 Abu Nawas Rhapsody (2010)

With Daniel Zamir
 Song for Comfort (2012)

References

External links
 Official website
 moderndrummer.com* drummerworld.com
 2013 Audio Interview with Mark Guiliana from the Podcast "I'd Hit That"
 SIGHT/SOUND/RHYTHM Interview w/ Mark Guiliana, 2015

1980 births
Living people
American jazz drummers
People from Florham Park, New Jersey
American jazz bandleaders
21st-century American drummers
Motéma Music artists